Trisha Lynn Ford (née Dean; born October 19, 1977) is an American softball coach who is the current head coach at Texas A&M.

Early life and education
Born and raised in Fremont, California, Ford graduated from American High School in Fremont. Ford then attended Saint Mary's College of California in nearby Moraga, where she graduated in 1999 with a bachelor's degree in political science. On the Saint Mary's Gaels softball team as Trisha Dean, Ford played at infielder from 1998 to 2000 under head coach Chelle Putzer. It is widely rumored that she will be named the next head coach at Texas A&M University at College Station,

Coaching career

Saint Mary's (2001–2003)
Ford was the hitting coach and recruiting coordinator at Saint Mary's for the 2001 season. On November 1, 2001, Ford became interim head coach, nearly a month after the resignation of Putzer. After a 17–37 season, Saint Mary's promoted Ford to the position long term on June 6, 2002. Saint Mary's improved to 25–27 in the 2003 season.

Stanford (2004–2012)
From 2004 to 2012, Ford was assistant coach at Stanford under John Rittman.

Fresno State (2013–2016)
On June 18, 2012, Ford was announced as the new head coach of the Fresno State softball program.

Arizona State (2017–2022)
On June 15, 2016, Trisha Ford was tabbed as the head coach of the Arizona State softball program. In her first season leading the Sun Devils, the 2017 team finished 31–22, 9–15 finishing sixth in Pac-12 play and went to the NCAA Tournament. In just Ford's second season at the helm of the Sun Devil Program, the team finished 48–13 and 16–8 in Pac-12 play. They finished with their best record since 2013. They finished third in the Pac-12 standings, their first conference top three finish since 2014. She led them to a Women's College World Series in 2018, where they eventually lost to Oklahoma.

Texas A&M (2023–Present)
On June 7, 2022, Trisha Ford was announced as the new head coach of the Texas A&M softball program.

Head coaching record

College

References

1977 births
Living people
Saint Mary's Gaels softball players
Saint Mary's Gaels softball coaches
Stanford Cardinal softball coaches
Fresno State Bulldogs softball coaches
Arizona State Sun Devils softball coaches
Texas A&M Aggies softball coaches
American softball coaches
People from Fremont, California
Sportspeople from Alameda County, California